The flag of Victoria, British Columbia, is light blue with the city's city's coat of arms in the centre. The flag was adopted in 1966 by the city council.

An alternate flag is sometimes seen, which consists of the city's official wordmark on a white field.

References

Flag
Flags of cities in British Columbia
Flags displaying animals
Flags introduced in 1966